¿Which Side Are You On? is the 17th studio album by singer-songwriter Ani DiFranco, released on January 17, 2012.

The title track is a revised version of the 1931 Florence Reece song "Which Side Are You On?" which was popularized by Pete Seeger. Seeger also provides accompanying vocals and banjo on the track.

Critical reception

The album has a score of 69 out of 100 from Metacritic based on "generally favorable reviews". The Boston Globe gave it a favorable review and stated that most of it "strikes a natural balance between matters of the heart and causes close to DiFranco's heart." The Independent gave it four stars out of five and called it "Ani DiFranco's first album in three years [that] finds the self-proclaimed Righteous Babe in feisty, thoughtful form." Blurt gave the album seven stars out of ten and stated: "The melodies aren't so easily embraced; loping, ephemeral and often sounding blithely disconnected, they defy any attempt at grasping an easy hook or chorus. What's more, the loose grooves sometimes run counter to the tunes' sense of profundity."

Mojo gave it three stars out of five and said the album was "sweet and to the point." Now also gave it three stars out of five and stated that the album "works best when DiFranco points to contradictions within herself, and worst when her lyrics get preachy or black-and-white." The Daily Telegraph likewise gave it three stars and said that DiFranco's "worthier sentiments are balanced by maturing wit, self-awareness and the distinctive snap'n'slap of her funky guitar grooves." Entertainment Weekly, however, gave the album a C and said that DiFranco "gets stuck in too many clunky Big Idea statements about equality and social politics."

Track listing

Personnel
Adapted from the credits.

Ani DiFranco – guitars, electric guitar, baritone guitar, tenor guitar, 12-string, percussion, synth bass, keyboards, synthesizer, harpsichord, drum, bells, voices, atmospherics
Todd Sickafoose – bass, bowed bass, electric bass, wurlitzer piano, mellotron, piano, harpsichord, theremin, sk1, bells, pump organ
Andy Borger – drums and percussion
Mike Dillon – vibraphone, tympanis, tubular bells, percussion, triangle, atmospherics
Allison Miller – drums, backing voice
Adam Levy – distorted electric guitar, electric guitar
CC Adcock – clean electric guitar
Pete Seeger – banjo, backing voice
Derrick Tabb – snare drum
The Rivertown Kids – backing voices
The Roots of Music Marching Crusaders – horns and drums
Michael Juan Nunez – pedal steel guitar
Dave Rosser – electric guitar
Ivan Neville – keyboard bass, synthesizer, backing voice
Cyril Neville – drums
Anaïs Mitchell – backing voice
Jeffrey Clemens – percussion
Ashley Toman – harp
Ben Ellman – tenor saxophone
Mark Mullins – trombone
Matt Perrine – tuba
Mike Napolitano – drum loops
Skerik – tenor saxophone (solo) and atmospherics

Production
Produced by Ani DiFranco and Mike Napolitano
Recorded by Mike Napolitano at Studio in the Country, Bogaloosa, LA
Additional Engineering – Ben Mumphry
Assistant Engineer – Jay Wesley at Brooklyn Bridge, Brooklyn, NY
Additional Engineering – Andy Taub
Assistant Engineer and Pro Tools Operator Extraordinaire – Ben Liscio
Mixed by Mike Napolitano and Ani DiFranco
Mastered by Brent Lambert at The Kitchen
Art Direction – Ani DiFranco and Brian Grunert
Design – Brian Grunert, Annie Stoll, and Maria Taczak
Peacock Photograph – Michael Napolitano
Ani Photographs – Patti Perret
Funnel and Feather Photographs – Biff Henrich

Charts
The album debuted at No. 82 on the Canadian Albums Chart and at No. 26 on the Billboard 200.

References

External links
Record labels album page
 

2012 albums
Ani DiFranco albums
Righteous Babe Records albums
Albums recorded at Studio in the Country